The qualifying heats and the finals of the Women's 400 metres Individual Medley event at the 1997 FINA Short Course World Championships were held on the first day of the championships, on Thursday 17 April 1997 in Gothenburg, Sweden.

Finals

Qualifying heats

See also
1996 Women's Olympic Games 400m Individual Medley
1997 Women's European LC Championships 400m Individual Medley

References
 Results

M
1997 in women's swimming